Saint-Josse, or Saint-Josse-sur-Mer (literally Saint-Josse on Sea), is a commune in the Pas-de-Calais department in the Hauts-de-France region of France.

Geography
Saint-Josse is located 4 miles (6 km) west of Montreuil-sur-Mer on the D144 road.  Before the 8th century, the sea came right up to the village, but it is nowadays 4 miles (6 km) to the west.

Population

History
In a place called Sidraga or Schaderias, Josse, a 7th-century Breton prince, the son of King Juthaêl, arrived in northern France and sought the protection of Haymon, Count of Ponthieu, to live as a hermit and renounce the crown of Brittany.
A small monastery was built in the 8th century at the place where Josse died. In 903, some monks, fleeing the Norman invasion took refuge in England. On their return, the abbey became a centre of pilgrimage, especially popular with the Germans in the 14th and 15th centuries. 
The abbey was closed in 1772, sold and then destroyed in 1789, leaving no traces of the monumental building.

In the village church is the shrine of Saint Josse, containing relics. In this shrine, opened in 1922, was a piece of 10th century Oriental fabric, which was sent to the Louvre museum, referenced under ‘the shroud of Saint Josse’.

Saint-Josse-on-Sea is still a famous place of pilgrimage. A procession takes place on the Tuesday following Whitsun. The reliquary containing the relics of the saint is carried to the calvary at the top of Bavémont hill at Airon-Saint-Vaast.

Places of interest
 The church of St. Peter, dating from the sixteenth century
 Two chateaux

See also
Communes of the Pas-de-Calais department

References

Saintjosse